Standpoint may refer to:

Theories 
 Standpoint theory, a postmodern method for analyzing inter-subjective discourses
 Standpoint feminism, an ideology that argues feminist social science should be practiced from the standpoint of women
 Perspective (cognitive), a point of view

Media 
 Standpoint (magazine), a monthly British cultural and political magazine
 The BVI Standpoint, a newspaper published in the British Virgin Islands